Dexopollenia maculata is a species of cluster fly in the family Polleniidae.

Distribution
Taiwan, China.

References

Polleniidae
Insects described in 1933
Diptera of Asia